Giuseppe De Falco (1 July 1908 - 25 September 1955) was an Italian politician.

Biography
De Falco was born in Montoro Superiore.  He represented the Common Man's Front in the Constituent Assembly of Italy from 1946 to 1948 and the Monarchist National Party in the Chamber of Deputies from 1953 to 1955.

References

1908 births
1955 deaths
People from Montoro, Campania
Common Man's Front politicians
National Union (Italy, 1947) politicians
Monarchist National Party politicians
Members of the Constituent Assembly of Italy
Deputies of Legislature II of Italy
Politicians of Campania